The Brazilian ironclad Lima Barros was originally ordered by Paraguay in 1864 with the name Belona, but was sold to Brazil when Paraguay could not make the final payments. She participated in the 1864–70 Paraguayan War between Brazil, Argentina and Uruguay against Paraguay.

Design and description
Lima Barros was designed as an enlarged, twin-turret, version of the river monitor . Lima Barros displaced  and was fitted with a ram bow. Her crew consisted of 170 officers and enlisted men. The ship had a pair of horizontal trunk steam engines, each driving one propeller shaft. She was barque-rigged with three pole masts and a bowsprit.

Lima Barros was armed with four 120-pounder Whitworth rifled, muzzle-loading guns mounted in two twin-gun turrets. The gun turret was also protected by 4.5 inches of armor.

Construction and service
Lima Barros, named after Midshipman Francisco Jose de Lima Barros, who was killed at the Battle of Riachuelo, was originally ordered by Paraguay from the British shipbuilding firm of Laird Brothers and was laid down in 1864 with the name of Belona and the yard number 327 at their Birkenhead shipyard. She was purchased by Brazil the following year, after the start of the war when Paraguay was cut off from the outside world and could no longer make payments. The ship was launched on 21 December 1865 and completed on 3 April 1866. She played a prominent role in the Paraguayan War, being one of the vessels successfully to run the gauntlet of a Paraguayan fort at the Passage of Curupayty.

Footnotes

References

External links
 Monitor Encouraçado "Lima Barros" 

Belona
Ironclad warships of the Brazilian Navy
1865 ships